Events from the year 1939 in Denmark.

Incumbents
 Monarch – Christian X
 Prime minister – Thorvald Stauning

Events

Births

Sport

Badminton
 12 March – Tage Madsen wins gold in Men's Single at the All England Badminton Championships.

Cycling
 Karel Kaers (BEL) and Omer De Bruycker (BEL) win the Six Days of Copenhagen sox-day track cycling race.

Footnall
 5 March – Næstved Boldklub is founded.
 B 93 wins their seventh Danish football championship by winning the 1938–39 Danish Championship League.

Deaths
 14 January – Prince Valdemar of Denmark (born 1858)
 26 March – Peter Hertz, art historian (born 1874)
 7 April – Mary Steen, photographer (born 1856)
 24 April – Harald Scavenius, diplomat and politician, Minister of Foreign Affairs 1920–22 (born 1873)
 4 June – Carl Cohn Haste, blind pianist, organist and composer, music teacher at the Royal Blind Institute, first president of the Danish Association of the Blind (born 1874)
 3 August – August Enna, composer (born 1859)
 4 October – Jens Lind, apothecary, botanist and mycologist (born 1874)
 16 October – Ludolf Nielsen, composer, violinist, conductor and pianist (born 1876)
 20 December – Fritz Syberg, artist and illustrator (born 1862)

References

 
Denmark
Years of the 20th century in Denmark
1930s in Denmark
1939 in Europe